Trška Gora is a Slovene place name that may refer to:

Trška Gora, Novo Mesto, a village in the City Municipality of Novo Mesto, southeastern Slovenia
Trška Gora, Krško, a village in the Municipality of Krško, southeastern Slovenia